The Champion Cook (French: Le cordon bleu) is a 1932 French comedy film directed by Karl Anton and starring Pierre Bertin, Jeanne Helbling and Louis Baron fils. It was made by the French subsidiary of Paramount Pictures at Joinville Studios near Paris.

Cast
Pierre Bertin as Oscar Ormont  
Jeanne Helbling as Irma  
Louis Baron fils as Bernereau  
Lucien Baroux as Lucien Dumorel  
Marguerite Moreno as Mme. Dumorel  
Marcel Vallée as Detective Dick  
Madeleine Guitty as Célestine  
Maurice Lagrenée as Arthur  
Edwige Feuillère as Régine  
Pedro Elviro as Achille 
Jeanne Fusier-Gir 
Simone Héliard

References

External links

1932 comedy films
French comedy films
Films directed by Karl Anton
Films shot at Joinville Studios
French black-and-white films
Paramount Pictures films
1930s French films